Alexander Elsdon Maunder (3 February 1861 – 2 February 1932) was a British sport shooter who competed at the 1908 Summer Olympics and the 1912 Summer Olympics.

In the 1908 Olympics, he won a gold medal in team trap shooting and a bronze medal in individual trap shooting. Four years later, he won a silver medal in the team clay pigeons event and was 45th in the trap event.

References

External links
Alexander Maunder's profile at databaseOlympics

1861 births
1932 deaths
British male sport shooters
Trap and double trap shooters
Olympic shooters of Great Britain
Shooters at the 1908 Summer Olympics
Shooters at the 1912 Summer Olympics
English Olympic medallists
Olympic gold medallists for Great Britain
Olympic silver medallists for Great Britain
Olympic bronze medallists for Great Britain
Olympic medalists in shooting
Medalists at the 1908 Summer Olympics
Medalists at the 1912 Summer Olympics